Luidia is a genus of starfish in the family Luidiidae  in which it is the only genus. Species of the family have a cosmopolitan distribution.

Characteristics
Members of the genus are characterised by having long arms with pointed tips fringed with spines. Their upper surfaces are covered with paxillae, pillar-like spines with flattened summits covered with minute spinules. The upper marginal plates are replaced by paxillae, but the lower marginal plates are large and covered with paxillae. The tube feet do not have suckers, but have two swollen regions. A mouth, oesophagus, and cardiac stomach are seen, but no pyloric stomach or anus is present. The gonads are underneath the sides of each arm.

The early larval stages of starfish are known as bipinnarial larvae, and members of this genus do not continue their development after this stage into a brachiolar stage before undergoing metamorphosis. However, they are capable of larval cloning, with asexual reproduction taking place while they are larvae. This has been shown to take place both in the field and in laboratory cultures and has been studied by molecular analysis of sequences of mitochondrial tRNA to identify the taxa involved.

Species
These species are recognised by the World Register of Marine Species:

Luidia alternata (Say, 1825) – banded sea star
Luidia amurensis Doderlein, 1920
Luidia armata Ludwig, 1905
Luidia asthenosoma Fisher, 1906
Luidia atlantidea Madsen, 1950
Luidia australiae Doderlein, 1920
Luidia avicularia Fisher, 1913
Luidia barbadensis Perrier, 1881
Luidia bellonae Lütken, 1865
Luidia changi Liu, Liao & Li, 2006
Luidia ciliaris (Philippi, 1837) – seven-armed star
Luidia clathrata (Say, 1825) – slender-armed starfish, gray sea star, lined sea star
Luidia columbia (Gray, 1840)
Luidia denudata Koehler, 1910
Luidia difficilis Liu, Liao & Li, 2006
Luidia ferruginea Ludwig, 1905
Luidia foliolata (Grube, 1866) – spiny mudstar, leafy flat star, sand star
Luidia gymnochora Fisher, 1913
Luidia hardwicki (Gray, 1840)
Luidia herdmani A.M. Clark, 1953
Luidia heterozona Fisher, 1940
Luidia hexactis H.L. Clark, 1938
Luidia inarmata Doderlein, 1920
Luidia integra Koehler, 1910
Luidia latiradiata (Gray, 1871)
Luidia lawrencei Hopkins & Knott, 2010
Luidia longispina Sladen, 1889
Luidia ludwigi Fisher, 1906
Luidia maculata Müller & Troschel, 1842
Luidia magellanica Leipoldt, 1895
Luidia magnifica Fisher, 1906 – magnificent star
Luidia mauritiensis Koehler, 1910
Luidia neozelanica Mortensen, 1925
Luidia orientalis Fisher, 1913
Luidia patriae Bernasconi, 1941
Luidia penangensis de Loriol, 1891
Luidia phragma H.L. Clark, 1910
Luidia porteri A.H. Clark, 1917
Luidia prionota Fisher, 1913
Luidia quinaria von Martens, 1865 – spiny sand sea star
Luidia sagamina Doderlein, 1920
Luidia sarsii Düben & Koren, 1845
Luidia savignyi (Audouin, 1826)
Luidia senegalensis (Lamark, 1816) – nine-armed sea star
Luidia sibogae Doderlein, 1920
Luidia superba A.H. Clark, 1917 – giant sea star
Luidia tessellata Lutken, 1859
Luidia yesoensis Goto, 1914

References

 
Asteroidea genera
Taxa named by Edward Forbes